Lawrence Joyce Kenney (August 30, 1930 – August 30, 1990) was a Roman Catholic bishop serving the Archdiocese for the Military Services.

Biography
Born in New Rochelle, New York, Kenney was ordained to the priesthood on June 2, 1956.

On March 25, 1983, Kenney was appointed titular bishop of Hólar and auxiliary bishop of the Roman Catholic Archdiocese for the Military Services, USA. He was consecrated bishop on May 10, 1983, and died in office.

See also

 Catholic Church hierarchy
 Catholic Church in the United States
 Historical list of the Catholic bishops of the United States
 Insignia of Chaplain Schools in the US Military
 List of Catholic bishops of the United States
 List of Catholic bishops of the United States: military service
 Lists of patriarchs, archbishops, and bishops
 Military chaplain
 Religious symbolism in the United States military
 United States military chaplains

References

External links
 Archdiocese for the Military Services, USA, official website
 Archdiocese for the Military Services of the United States. GCatholic.org. Retrieved 2010-08-20.

Episcopal succession

1930 births
1990 deaths
Religious leaders from New Rochelle, New York
20th-century American Roman Catholic titular bishops
American military chaplains
Chaplains
Catholics from New York (state)